The Rajah Sulaiman Movement  was an organization in the Philippines, founded by Ahmed Santos in 1991. According to the Philippine government, the group's militants had been trained, financed and governed by Abu Sayyaf and Jemaah Islamiah, a Philippine terrorist group with links to Al Qaeda.

See also
 History of the Philippines
 Religious terrorism

References

External links
 Philippines Terrorism: The Role of Militant Islamic Converts

Terrorism in the Philippines